Dana Alix Zzyym (born 1958) is an intersex activist and veteran of the U.S. Navy. After the culmination of a six-year legal battle, they became the first U.S. citizen to receive an official U.S. passport with an “X” sex/gender marker.

Early life
Zzyym was born in 1958. Zzyym has expressed that their childhood as a military brat made it out of the question for them to be associated with the queer community as a youth due to the prevalence of homophobia in the armed forces. Their parents hid Zzyym's status as intersex from them and Zzyym discovered their identity and the surgeries their parents had approved for them by themselves after their Navy service. In 1978, Zzyym joined the Navy as a machinist's mate.

Activism
Zzyym is the associate director of the Intersex Campaign for Equality. They are nonbinary and intersex.

Legal case
Zzyym is the first veteran to seek a non-binary gender U.S. passport, in the lawsuit Zzyym v. Blinken (formerly Zzyym v. Pompeo, Zzyym v. Tillerson, and Zzyym v. Kerry). In light of the State Department's continuing refusal to recognize an appropriate gender marker, on June 27, 2017, a federal court granted Lambda Legal's motion to reopen the case. On September 19, 2018, the United States District Court for the District of Colorado enjoined the U.S. Department of State from relying upon its binary-only gender marker policy to withhold the requested passport. In February 2021, the state department stated "To fully integrate the change into its software systems would take approximately 24 months and cost $11 million".

In October 2021, they became the first U.S. citizen to receive an official U.S. passport with an "X" sex/gender marker.

See also
 Intersex people and military service
 Intersex people and military service in the United States
 Elisa Rae Shupe

References

Further reading
 U.S. Passports Can't Be Denied Over Refusal to Select a Gender, a Judge Has Ruled, Time

1958 births
Living people
American LGBT military personnel
Intersex rights activists
Intersex military personnel
Intersex non-binary people
Intersex people and military service in the United States
Intersex rights in the United States
United States Navy sailors
Non-binary activists
21st-century American LGBT people